Renata Šmekálová (born 30 March 1969) is a Slovak former professional tennis player.

While competing on the professional tour, Šmekálová had a career high singles ranking of 213 in the world and won two ITF titles. In 1989 she featured in the singles main draw of a WTA Tour tournament in Guarujá.

From 1993 to 1994 she played at collegiate level for Southeastern Louisiana University, amassing a 44–3 record in singles. She was the Southeastern and TAAC Female Athlete of the Year in 1994.

ITF finals

Singles: 3 (2–1)

References

External links
 
 

1969 births
Living people
Slovak female tennis players
Czechoslovak female tennis players
College women's tennis players in the United States
Southeastern Louisiana University alumni